The Metropolitan Avenue station was a station on the demolished section of the BMT Jamaica Line in Queens, New York City. It opened in 1918 and closed in 1985 in anticipation of the opening of the Archer Avenue lines.

History 
This station was built as part of the Dual Contracts. It opened on July 3, 1918 by the Brooklyn Union Elevated Railroad, an affiliate of the Brooklyn Rapid Transit Company, after the removal of Atlantic Avenue Rapid Transit service from Dunton LIRR station, and closed on April 15, 1985, with the Q49 bus replacing it until December 11, 1988.  The Q49 bus was discontinued when the rest of the Jamaica Line was connected to the Archer Avenue Subway.

Both the Metropolitan Avenue and Queens Boulevard stations were demolished in late 1990. The Jamaica–Van Wyck station, opened on December 11, 1988, is directly underneath the site of the former Metropolitan Avenue station and replaces the two former Jamaica Line stations.

Station layout 
This elevated station had two tracks and two side platforms, with space for a third track in the center. A short stretch of third track was added for use as a lay-up or storage track, along with a scissor crossover near the temporary Queens Boulevard terminal in 1976, in anticipation of the line being cut back from 168th Street.

References

External links 
 
 

Defunct BMT Jamaica Line stations
1985 disestablishments in New York (state)
1918 establishments in New York City
Railway stations in the United States opened in 1916
Railway stations closed in 1985
Former elevated and subway stations in Queens, New York
Jamaica, Queens